Allison Au is a Canadian jazz saxophonist. She has been nominated twice for a Juno Award for best jazz album, winning once.

Career
Au was born to a Chinese father and a Jewish mother; her maternal grandmother is a Holocaust survivor.

Au grew up in Toronto listening to her father's diverse record collection. She started classical piano lessons at age six and started playing the alto saxophone in elementary school at Grade 7. She graduated from Humber College's music program.

She formed the Allison Au quartet in 2009.

Discography
 The Sky Was Pale Blue, Then Grey (2013)
 Forest Grove (2016)
 Wander Wonder (2018)

Awards 
 2013 Juno Award for Best Contemporary Jazz Album (nominated) 
 2016 Juno Award for Best Group Jazz Album

References

Canadian jazz saxophonists
21st-century Canadian women musicians
Living people
Juno Award winners
21st-century saxophonists
Women saxophonists
Year of birth missing (living people)